Sonny Chua (2 November 1967 – 9 September 2020) was an Australian composer, pianist and music educator. From 2002 to 2007 he taught at Melbourne High School. Chua's contributions at Melbourne High are of broader notability in light of his development of the Mass Singing culture and his direction of the Chorale, which serves as a model for use of singing as a developmental and educational tool.

He left Melbourne High to become the Director of Music at Mac.Robertson Girls' High School, a sister school whose musical activities were closely coordinated with Melbourne High, including the annual winter concert. He was later the Coordinator of Keyboard Studies at Carey Baptist Grammar School, in Melbourne.

Early life
Chua was born on 2 November 1967 in Penang, Malaysia. to Richard and Jenny Chua. The eldest of four children, he also lived in Kuala Lumpur, Singapore and Malacca, before the family immigrated to Melbourne, Australia.

Education 
Chua started piano lessons in Malacca at age 8, and continued his piano studies in Melbourne with Julie Zelman, who encouraged him to explore a range of modern music styles. It was at this point, that his creative journey began. He attended the Victorian College of the Arts Secondary School (VCASS), studying piano under Stephen McIntyre. He completed a Bachelor of Music degree at University of Melbourne, Conservatorium of Music, specialising in piano performance, with Ronald Farren-Price AO, Alexander Semestky and Max Cooke; and also studied composition with Peter Tahourdin, Barry Cunningham and Brenton Broadstock.

Works 
Sonny Chua composed a myriad of piano compositions. His music is listed in all Australia examination syllabuses and in competitions around the world. As an educationalist, Chua was regularly invited to present masterclasses and talks on piano technique and musicianship and he has spoken in music conferences including the International Society of Music Education world conferences in Malaysia and Brazil, and at the Australasian Piano Pedagogy Conferences on piano teaching and composition.

Chua's music is characterised by its "playfulness with styles and musical techniques". His piece "Theme and 12 Deviations" exemplifies this playfulness, using the motif from Chopsticks (music) to highlight musical features of major eras of music.

Alongside his contributions to classical piano, Chua composed works at a variety of difficulty levels for use in the Australian Music Examinations Board examinations system. His music has proved popular among the variety of qualifying pieces, and was featured in the winning performance for the 2016 Foster's Music Award - awarded to the top music examinee in North-West Tasmania.

Personal life 
Chua married musician, Melinda Ceresoli, in 2009 and they lived in Melbourne with their two young daughters, and dog.

Sonny died on 9 September 2020 following a stroke.

References

External links
 

1967 births
2020 deaths
Australian composers
Malaysian emigrants to Australia
People from Penang